Donald Whiteside (born April 25, 1969) is an American former professional basketball player. Listed as a 5'10", 160 lb point guard, he played college basketball for Northern Illinois University.

In 1992, Whiteside had a brief stint with the Goldfields Giants, before going on to play two seasons in the NBL for the Hobart Devils in 1992 and 1993. Between 1996 and 1997, he played in the NBA for the Toronto Raptors and Atlanta Hawks. He also had stints in Latvia (for Rīgas Laiks), Czech Republic and Spain, as well as in the Continental Basketball Association and the American Basketball Association.

References

External links

Donald Whiteside at niuhuskies.com
Donald Whiteside at foxsportspulse.com
One More Try Finally Lands Whiteside In The Nba at chicagotribune.com

1969 births
Living people
American expatriate basketball people in Australia
American expatriate basketball people in Canada
American expatriate basketball people in the Czech Republic
American expatriate basketball people in Latvia
American expatriate basketball people in Spain
American men's basketball players
Atlanta Hawks players
Basketball players from Chicago
Hobart Devils players
La Crosse Bobcats players
Liga ACB players
Northern Illinois Huskies men's basketball players
Point guards
Rockford Lightning players
Toronto Raptors players
Undrafted National Basketball Association players